Lebanon participated in the 2018 Asian Games in Jakarta and Palembang, Indonesia from 18 August to 2 September 2018. Lebanon first competed at the Asian Games in 1978 Bangkok, and the best achievement was in the 2006 Doha, when the country gained a gold, and 2 silver medals. At the last edition in Incheon, Lebanon collected 2 medals, a silver and a bronze.

Medalists

The following Lebanon competitors won medals at the Games.

|  style="text-align:left; width:78%; vertical-align:top;"|

|  style="text-align:left; width:22%; vertical-align:top;"|

Competitors 
The following is a list of the number of competitors representing Lebanon that participated at the Games:

 1 men's and 1 women's also competed in sambo.

Athletics 

Lebanon entered two athletes (1 men and 1 women) to participate in the athletics competition at the Games.

Cycling

Mountain biking

Fencing 

Individual

Team

Golf 

Men

Gymnastics

Ju-jitsu 

Men

Judo 

Lebanon competed at the Games with 4 judokas (3 men's and 1 women's).

Men

Women

Kurash 

Men

Women

Sambo

Shooting 

Men

Women

Mixed team

Swimming 

Men

Women

Table tennis 

Individual

Taekwondo 

Kyorugi

Tennis 

Men

Wrestling 

Lebanon entered the wrestling competition at the Games with one wrestler. Domenic Abounader claimed the silver medal after finished in the second position in the men's freestyle −86 kg event.

Men's freestyle

Wushu 

Sanda

References 

Nations at the 2018 Asian Games
2018
Asian Games